The Berlin Sculpture-Network is a cooperative project between the Antiquities Collection of the Berlin State Museums and the Institute of Classical Archaeology at the Free University of Berlin. It is funded by the German Federal Ministry of Education and Research within the initiative “Translating Humanities” (“Übersetzungsfunktion von Geisteswissenschaften"). This project aims to reconstruct the spatial, functional and substantive contexts context of ancient sculptures.

The "Berlin Sculpture-Network" project includes a database of the ancient sculptures in the museums, the associated archival records and current excavation data as well as the collection of all plaster casts in the Berlin collections. The data will be made available in the online database Arachne.

Objects 

Selected research results will be shown in a major exhibition in the Pergamon Museum in 2011, where an interactive 3D visualization of archaeological monuments of the city of Pergamon will be introduced to the general public. This virtual 3D model will be a research tool combining the latest research results from the excavations in Pergamon and the reconstruction of the famous city in its surrounding landscape with marble sculptures shown in their original contexts. The exhibition provides a basis for the long-term development of new exhibition concepts for the Berlin Antiquities collection of the Berlin State Museums.

The "Berlin Sculpture-Network" is a platform for scientific exchange between project members and numerous specialists in and outside of Berlin who research Greek and Roman sculpture and supply scientific contributions to the project.

See also 

 German Archaeological Institute, Berlin central office
 German Archaeological Institute, Istanbul
 Exzellenzcluster 264 „TOPOI – The Formation and Transformation of Space and Knowledge in Ancient Civilizations“
 The Winckelmann Institute for Classical Archaeology at the Humboldt University of Berlin
 Konrad Zuse Center for Information Engineering, Berlin
 Chair for Presentation Teaching by the Technical University of Cottbus in Brandenburg
 Archaeological Institute and Research Archive for Ancient Sculpture at the University of Cologne: Arachne (archaeological database)
 Municipal Museums of Berlin – PK, Institute for Museum Research
 Municipal Museums of Berlin – PK, Plaster Casts

References

Art and design organizations
Culture in Berlin